Blethisa multipunctata is a species of ground beetle native to Europe.
The habitat is stream, river and lake margins. It 
is amphibious, able to hunt below water for up to an hour.

References

multipunctata
Beetles described in 1758
Taxa named by Carl Linnaeus
Beetles of Europe